Moritz Ludwig Frankenheim (29 June 1801 – 14 January 1869) was a German physicist, geographer, and crystallographer.

Life and education 

Moritz Ludwig Frankenheim  was born in 1801 in Brunswick. His family was Jewish. He attended the Gymnasium (high school) there and in Wolfenbüttel.  Afterwards he went to Berlin to attend the Alma Mater Berolinensis (today Humboldt University of Berlin) to study physics. In 1823 he completed a dissertation titled Dissertatio de Theoria Gasorum et Vaporum Meditationes ("Contemplations on the scientific theory of gases and vapors"). Inspired by the research of his teacher Christian Samuel Weiss (1780-1856), he became interested in crystallography.  In 1827 he moved to the University of Breslau, where he was assistant professor of physics, geography, and mathematics from 1827 to 1850. In 1850 he was promoted to the position of professor of these subjects.  After his retirement, he first moved to Leipzig and then to Dresden, where he died in 1869 at the age of 67.

Work 

Frankenheim's focus of research was crystallography, particularly studies of crystal structure and the mathematical and theoretical basis of the symmetry of crystals. By 1826, he was already using the integer reciprocals of Weiss' coefficients (the intersection of a plane with the three crystallographic axes) to describe the spatial positions of crystal surfaces, from which the British crystallographer William Hallowes Miller (1801-1880) developed the concept of Miller indices in 1839.  By assigning symmetry elements to the crystal systems defined previously by Weiss and Friedrich Mohs (1773-1839), Frankenheim was able, for the first time, to define 32 point groups (crystal classes) and to classify them into four crystal systems (the regular one, the fourfold, the twofold and the sixfold).  From his observations he derived 15 lattice types for crystals, which were later reduced by Auguste Bravais (1811-1863) to 14 and today as Bravais lattices describe unit cells of crystal structures. Frankenheim conducted one of the first microscopic examinations of crystals in polarized light, using the then-new Nicol prism as a polarizer.

In the field of geography, his most famous work is his book Völkerkunde ("Ethnology"), published in 1852.

Publications 

Dissertatio de Theoria Gasorum et Vaporum Meditationes (Contemplations on the scientific theory of gases and vapors), Berlin 1823.
Crystallonomische Aufsätze (Essays on crystallography), ISIS, Vol. 19, pp. 497–515, 542–565, Jena 1826.
Populäre Astronomie (Popular Astronomy), Brunswick 1827.
De Crystallorum Cohäsione (Cohesion of crystals), Breslau 1829.
Die Lehre von der Cohäsion, umfassend die Elasticität der Gase, die Elasticität und Cohärenz der flüssigen und festen Körper und die Krystallkunde (Theory of cohesion, encompassing the elasticity of gases, the elasticity and coherence of liquids and solids, and crystallography), Breslau 1835.
System der Krystalle (Crystal systems), Breslau 1842.
Krystallisation und Amorphie (Crystallization and amorphicity), Breslau 1851.
Völkerkunde (Ethnology), Breslau 1852.
Ueber das Entstehen und das Wachsen der Krystalle nach mikroskopischen Beobachtungen (On microscopic observations of the emergence and growth of crystals), 1860.
Zur Krystallkunde. I. Characteristiken der Krystalle. (On crystal structure. I. Characteristics of crystals.), Leipzig 1869.

References 

 J. Lima-de-Faria (Ed.): Historical Atlas of Crystallography, 1st Edition, Kluwer Academic Publishers, Dordrecht 1990, .
 E. Scholz: Symmetrie, Gruppe, Dualität: Zur Beziehung zwischen theoretischer Mathematik und Anwendung in Kristallographie und Baustatik des 19. Jahrhunderts. (Symmetry, group, duality: On the relationship between theoretical mathematics and applications in crystallography and structural analysis in the 19th century.). In: Science Networks. Historical Studies, Vol. 1, Birkhäuser, Basel 1989, .

External links 
 The theory of cohesion on minrec.org.

1801 births
1869 deaths
Scientists from Braunschweig
People from the Duchy of Brunswick
19th-century German Jews
19th-century German physicists